John Millson is a Canadian politician and businessman. He served as mayor of Windsor, Ontario, from 1988 to 1991, later becoming president of the Windsor Raceway. In 2009 he co-founded Great Lakes Energy Limited.

Biography
Millson attended J.L. Forster Secondary School, where he joined the school band. He later recalled that the band teacher, Ernie Gerenda, had given him and the other band members tough love, at times being a bully, and at times playing practical jokes. Millson later attended the University of Windsor.

Millson ran successfully for alderman of Windsor's Ward 2 in 1982. He later defeated incumbent Ted Bounsall by a margin of 2,764 votes. Millson was elected as mayor of Windsor in 1988 with a total of 31,303 votes, taking office in November. He did not run for reelection in 1991 in order to spend more time with his family.

Millson later worked as president of Windsor Raceway, earning CAD 300,000 per annum in 1998. He stepped down in 2006.

Millson teamed up with president of Southwestern Manufacturing Vince Schiller and VP Mike Mitchell to found Great Lakes Energy, which builds and owns solar installations across Ontario, in 2009.  He is currently its president.  He was suggested as a candidate for the 2010 election, but said he was too busy.

In 2011, Millson was suggested as a possible replacement for Windsor West Member of Provincial Parliament Sandra Pupatello. Although Millson did not confirm that he would be running, he said he was "flattered" that people thought he would be a good candidate. It has been rumoured that Pupatello would be backing him.

On September 4, 2014, Millson announced he would be a candidate for Mayor of Windsor in the municipal election held on October 27, 2014. He lost to Drew Dilkens.

References

Bibliography

 
 
 

 
 
 
 
 
 

Living people
University of Windsor alumni
Canadian businesspeople
Mayors of Windsor, Ontario
Year of birth missing (living people)